This is a list of British Columbia's 79 provincial electoral districts (also known as ridings in Canadian English) as defined by the 1999 Representation Order, which came into effect for the 2001 election. Obsolete historical districts are listed in the British Columbia provincial electoral districts category page, which can be reached via the Canadian electoral districts category link at the bottom of the individual riding pages listed below.

Electoral districts are constituencies that elect MLAs to the Legislative Assembly of British Columbia every election.
 Abbotsford-Clayburn
 Abbotsford-Mount Lehman
 Alberni-Qualicum
 Bulkley Valley-Stikine
 Burnaby North
 Burnaby-Edmonds
 Burnaby-Willingdon
 Burquitlam
 Cariboo North
 Cariboo South
 Chilliwack-Kent
 Chilliwack-Sumas
 Columbia River-Revelstoke
 Comox Valley
 Coquitlam-Maillardville
 Cowichan-Ladysmith
 Delta North
 Delta South
 East Kootenay
 Esquimalt-Metchosin
 Fort Langley-Aldergrove
 Kamloops
 Kamloops-North Thompson
 Kelowna-Lake Country
 Kelowna-Mission
 Langley
 Malahat-Juan de Fuca
 Maple Ridge-Mission
 Maple Ridge-Pitt Meadows
 Nanaimo
 Nanaimo-Parksville
 Nelson-Creston
 New Westminster
 North Coast
 North Island
 North Vancouver-Lonsdale
 North Vancouver-Seymour
 Oak Bay-Gordon Head
 Okanagan-Vernon
 Okanagan-Westside
 Peace River North
 Peace River South
 Penticton-Okanagan Valley
 Port Coquitlam-Burke Mountain
 Port Moody-Westwood
 Powell River-Sunshine Coast
 Prince George North
 Prince George-Mount Robson
 Prince George-Omineca
 Richmond Centre
 Richmond East
 Richmond-Steveston
 Saanich North and the Islands
 Saanich South
 Shuswap
 Skeena
 Surrey-Cloverdale
 Surrey-Green Timbers
 Surrey-Newton
 Surrey-Panorama Ridge
 Surrey-Tynehead
 Surrey-Whalley
 Surrey-White Rock
 Vancouver-Burrard
 Vancouver-Fairview
 Vancouver-Fraserview
 Vancouver-Hastings
 Vancouver-Kensington
 Vancouver-Kingsway
 Vancouver-Langara
 Vancouver-Mount Pleasant
 Vancouver-Point Grey
 Vancouver-Quilchena
 Victoria-Beacon Hill
 Victoria-Hillside
 West Kootenay-Boundary
 West Vancouver-Capilano
 West Vancouver-Garibaldi
 Yale-Lillooet